Vijaya Maruti Creatives Private Limited (VMC Productions) is a company established by V. Doraswamy Raju which has produced and distributed several Telugu films. Its head office is situated in Hyderabad, Telangana. Its films Seetharamaiah Gari Manavaralu and Annamayya won the Filmfare Award for Best Film - Telugu.

Filmography

Production

Distribution
VMC has distributed more than 400 films in ceded region.

References

telugufilmproducerscouncil

Mass media companies established in 1978
Film production companies based in Hyderabad, India
1978 establishments in Andhra Pradesh